Derwood is an unincorporated area and census-designated place in east-central Montgomery County, Maryland, United States. It lays just north of Rockville, southeast of Gaithersburg, southwest of Olney, and northwest of the greater Silver Spring area.  Derwood was originally "Deer Park" and was then "Deer Wood" before getting its current name.

The unincorporated area of Derwood includes the neighborhoods of Derwood Heights, Derwood Station, Mill Creek Towne, Needwood Estates, Muncaster Manor, Muncaster View, Hollybrooke, Granby Woods, Park Overlook, Preserve at Rock Creek, Redland Crossing, Candlewood Park, Cashell Estates, Avery Forest, Avery Lodge, Avery Village, Bowie Mill Estates, Bowie Mill Park, Winters Run, Redland Station, Rolling Knolls, Emory Grove, and Shady Grove Crossing, but the census-designated place consists of a far smaller area.

Between 2009 and 2011, Maryland Route 200 (also known as the Intercounty Connector or ICC) was constructed directly through central Derwood, affecting Cashell Estates and areas near Shady Grove Road.

History
Derwood was first recognized in the 1880s as a train stop on the B&O Railroad, which is now the intersection of Indianola Drive and Maryland Route 355 in Derwood Station. A second, larger railroad station was built in Derwood from 1886-1889.  In the early 1900s, a small community grew up around the station.

On January 7, 1954, Schwartz Mill caught fire and both it and the Derwood railroad station were destroyed. Derwood station was never rebuilt, since there were not enough passengers traveling through the area.

In 1965, the man-made Lake Needwood was created by impounding Rock Creek.

In 1974, the Derwood post office relocated to Redland Shopping Center. It kept the name "Derwood Branch," and designated the entire 20855 zip code area as Derwood, greatly increasing its size. The community's population expanded with the establishment of Shady Grove Metro station in 1984.

Geography

Derwood is located in the north central part of Montgomery County, in the Atlantic coastal plain. The community is near the start of the Appalachian highlands.

Derwood has a humid subtropical climate similar to nearby Washington D.C. It lies in hardiness zone 7a, with chilly winters, where the daily maximum temperatures are mostly above freezing, and the minimum are generally below freezing.

Demographics

Economy
Goodwill Industries is based in Derwood.

The Derwood Dusters football team of the DTFL plays their home games in Derwood.

Public schools
Residents are zoned to Montgomery County Public Schools.

Students who are residents of Derwood are either in the Magruder or Richard Montgomery cluster and attend the following schools, some of which are outside of Derwood:

Elementary schools
 Washington Grove Elementary School
 Mill Creek Towne Elementary School
 Sequoyah Elementary School
 Candlewood Elementary School
 College Gardens Elementary School
Judith A Resnik Elementary School
Middle schools
 Redland Middle School
 Shady Grove Middle School
 Julius West Middle School 
High schools
 Colonel Zadok A. Magruder High School
 Richard Montgomery High School

References

External links
PDF of Proposed ICC Route

Census-designated places in Montgomery County, Maryland
Census-designated places in Maryland
Derwood, Maryland
Populated places established in the 1880s
1880s establishments in Maryland